Tuckett is a surname and may be:

 Sir Alan Tuckett (born 1948), British adult education specialist 
 Bob Tuckett (born 1948), Saint Kitts and Nevis boxer
 Carl Tuckett (born 1970), West Indian cricketer
 Christopher M. Tuckett, British Professor of New Testament Studies
 Francis Fox Tuckett (1834–1913), British  mountaineer
 George Elias Tuckett (1835–1900), Canadian mayor of Hamilton, Ontario
 Glen Tuckett (born 1927), American baseball coach and athletic director
 Henry A. Tuckett (1852–1918), American hymn writer and poet
 Iain Tuckett, British regeneration and community housing pioneer
 Len Tuckett (1885–1963),  South African cricketer
 Lindsay Tuckett (born 1919), South African cricketer